Veronika Vladimirovna Vernadskaya (born 7 May 1995) is a Russian actress known for her roles in the Russian-American film "The Darkest Hour" and the film "Mukha".

Biography
Educated at the Theatre of the Young Muscovites on Sparrow Hills and the Moscow Art Theatre School, Vernadskaya started her career in Russian television series and is trilingual, speaking Russian, French and English. Later she studied at the acting faculty of New York Film Academy. Graduated from VGIK as a film director.

Selected filmography

References

External links
 

1995 births
Living people
Russian child actresses
Russian film actresses
Russian television actresses
Actresses from Moscow